Carlos Alejandro Villanueva Martínez (4 June 1908 – 11 April 1944) was a Peruvian footballer who played for Alianza Lima and the Peru national football team. He is considered one of the most important Alianza strikers in the 1920s and 1930s.

Club career
Born in Lima, started his career at Teniente Ruiz but moved on after a year to the club where he would play the rest of his career, Alianza Lima.

He is known to be Peru's historic bicycle kick figure. Alejandro Villanueva was noted to have an extraordinary handling the football, and his many outrageous moves won him the nickname "Manguera." Among his many exploits, the bicycle kick was one of the moves that won him widespread recognition. While playing for Alianza Lima, Villanueva's fame increased as he made international appearances such as in 1933 when Alianza Lima made a tour in Chile and, with fellow Peruvians such as Teodoro Fernandez, delighted the audiences with his skill and defeated a series of important Chilean clubs of that time such as Club Deportivo Magallanes, Santiago Wanderers, Audax Italiano, and Colo-Colo.  In Peru, Villanueva is often remembered as one of the finest exponents of that nation's association football and as the player that amazed the crowds with his bicycle kicks. The people of Lima at first thought the bicycle kick was his invention when he executed it in 1928, and commonly called it "tiro caracol." Later, the name changed to "chalaca" when people began to favor the idea that the move was invented in Callao several decades earlier. As a result of these achievements, Villanueva remains a famous figure in Peru to the point that several songs have been made about him and his eternal club, Alianza Lima.

International career
With the Peru national football team he played at the 1927 and 1937 Copa America, 1930 FIFA World Cup and 1936 Summer Olympics. Villanueva played on the team that won the football tournament at the inaugural Bolivarian Games in 1938.

Death and legacy
Villanueva died at the age of 35 after contracting tuberculosis. Alianza Lima's stadium, located in the La Victoria district of Lima, is named after him and is popularly known as "Matute".

Honours

Club
 Alianza Lima
 Peruvian League: 1927, 1928, 1931, 1932, 1933
 First tier of the league of Lima and Callao: 1939

Individual
Peruvian League's Top Scorer: 1929, 1931

Statistics

International goals

Scores and results table. Peru's goal tally first:

References

External links 

Club Alianza Lima – Villanueva honored in Alianza Lima's official website.

1908 births
1944 deaths
Footballers from Lima
Association football forwards
Peruvian footballers
Peru international footballers
1930 FIFA World Cup players
Footballers at the 1936 Summer Olympics
Olympic footballers of Peru
Peruvian Primera División players
Club Alianza Lima footballers
20th-century deaths from tuberculosis
Tuberculosis deaths in Peru